Homework is a set of tasks assigned to students by their teachers to be completed outside the classroom. Common homework assignments may include required reading, a writing or typing project, mathematical exercises to be completed, information to be reviewed before a test, or other skills to be practiced.

The effects of homework are debated. Generally speaking, homework does not improve academic performance among young children. Homework may improve academic skills among older students, especially lower-achieving students. However, homework also creates stress for students and parents, and reduces the amount of time that students can spend in other activities.

Purposes 

The basic objectives of assigning homework to students often align with schooling in general. However, teachers have many purposes for assigning homework, including:
 reinforcing skills taught in class
 extending skills to new situations
 preparing for future class lessons
 engaging students in active learning
 developing time management and study skills
 promoting parent-student communications
 encouraging collaboration between students
 fulfilling school/district policies 
 demonstrating a rigorous school program to others
 punishing a student or a class

Effects

Academic performance 

Homework research dates back to the early 1900s. However, no consensus exists on the general effectiveness on homework. Results of homework studies vary based on multiple factors, such as the age group of those studied and the measure of academic performance.

Younger students who spend more time on homework generally have slightly worse, or the same academic performance, as those who spend less time on homework. Homework has not been shown to improve academic achievements for grade school students. Proponents claim that assigning homework to young children helps them learn good study habits.  Essentially, they advocate for doing potentially unnecessary homework from approximately age five to ten as a way of practicing for doing necessary homework from age 10 to 15.  No research has ever been conducted to determine whether this claim has any merit.

Among teenagers, students who spend more time on homework generally have higher grades, and higher test scores than students who spend less time on homework. Large amounts of homework cause students' academic performance to worsen, even among older students.  Students who are assigned homework in middle and high school score somewhat better on standardized tests, but the students who have more than 90 minutes of homework a day in middle school or more than two hours in high school score worse.

Low-achieving students receive more benefit from doing homework than high-achieving students.  However, school teachers commonly assign less homework to the students who need it most, and more homework to the students who are performing well. In past centuries, homework was a cause of academic failure: when school attendance was optional, students would drop out of school entirely if they were unable to keep up with the homework assigned.

Non-academic 
The amount of homework given does not necessarily affect students' attitudes towards homework and various other aspects of school.

For all three of the correlations, higher values represent a higher correlation between time spent on homework and poor conduct.

 says that homework develops students' motivation and study skills. In a single study, parents and teachers of middle school students believed that homework improved students' study skills and personal responsibility skills. Their students were more likely to have negative perceptions about homework and were less likely to ascribe the development of such skills to homework.  found that students generally had negative emotions when completing homework and reduced engagement compared to other activities.

Health and daily life 
Homework has been identified in numerous studies and articles as a dominant or significant source of stress and anxiety for students. Studies on the relation between homework and health are few compared to studies on academic performance.

 surveyed 1,983 students in Hong Kong, and found that homework led not only to added stress and anxiety, but also physical symptoms, such as headaches and stomachaches. Students in the survey who were ridiculed or punished by parents and peers had a higher incidence of depression symptoms, with 2.2% of students reporting that they "always" had suicidal thoughts, and anxiety was exacerbated by punishments and criticism of students by teachers for both problems with homework as well as forgetting to hand in homework.

A 2007 study of American students by MetLife found that 89% of students felt stressed from homework, with 34% reporting that they "often" or "very often" felt stressed from homework. Stress was especially evident among high school students. Students that reported stress from homework were more likely to be deprived of sleep.

Homework can cause tension and conflict in the home as well as at school, and can reduce students' family and leisure time. In the  survey, failure to complete homework and low grades where homework was a contributing factor was correlated with greater conflict; some students have reported teachers and parents frequently criticizing their work. In the MetLife study, high school students reported spending more time completing homework than performing home tasks.  argued that homework can create family conflict and reduce students' quality of life. However,  found that parents were less likely to report homework as a distraction from their children's activities and responsibilities.  recommended further empirical study relating to this aspect due to the difference between student and parent observations.

Time use 
A University of Michigan Institute for Social Research nationally representative survey of American 15- to 17-year olds, conducted in 2003, found an average of 50 minutes of homework each weekday.

A 2019 Pew Research Center review of Bureau of Labor Statistics' American Time Use Survey data reported that 15-, 16-, and 17-year-olds Americans, spent on average an hour a day on homework during the school year. The change in this demographic's average daily time spent doing homework (during the school year) increased by about 16 minutes from 2003-2006 to 2014-2017. U.S. teenage girls spent more time doing homework than U.S. teenage boys. 

A 2019 nationally representative survey of 95,505 freshmen at U.S. colleges, conducted by the UCLA Higher Education Research Institute, asked respondents, "During your last year in high school, how much time did you spend during a typical week studying/doing homework?" 1.9% of respondents said none, 7.4% said less than one hour, 19.5% said 1-2 hours, 27.9% said 3-5 hours, 21.4% said 6-10 hours, 11.4% said 11-15 hours, 6.0% said 16-20 hours, 4.5% said over 20 hours. 

 surveyed 4,317 students from ten "privileged, high-performing" high schools in the U.S., and found that students reported spending more than 3 hours on homework daily. 72% of the students reported stress from homework, and 82% reported physical symptoms. The students slept an average of 6 hours 48 minutes, lower than recommendations prescribed by various health agencies.

Benefits
Some educators argue that homework is beneficial to students, as it enhances learning, develops the skills taught in class, and lets educators verify that students comprehend their lessons. Proponents also argue that homework makes it more likely that students will develop and maintain proper study habits that they can use throughout their educational career.

History

United States 
Historically, homework was frowned upon in American culture. With few students able to pursue higher education, and with many children and teenagers needing to dedicate significant amounts of time to chores and farm work, homework was disliked not only by parents, but also by some schools. The students' inability to keep up with the homework, which was largely memorizing an assigned text at home, contributed to students dropping out of school at a relatively early age. Attending school was not legally required, and if the student could not spend afternoons and evenings working on homework, then the student could quit school.

Complaints from parents were common at all levels of society. In 1880, Francis Amasa Walker convinced the school board in Boston to prohibit teachers from assigning math homework under normal circumstances. In 1900, journalist Edward Bok railed against schools assigning homework to students until age 15. He encouraged parents to send notes to their children's teachers to demand the end of all homework assignments, and thousands of parents did so. Others looked at the new child labor laws in the United States and noted that school time plus homework exceeded the number of hours that a child would be permitted to work for pay.  The campaign resulted in the US Congress receiving testimony to the effect that experts thought children should never have any homework, and that teenagers should be limited to a maximum of two hours of homework per day. In 1901, the California legislature passed an act that effectively abolished homework for anyone under the age of 15.  While homework was generally out of favor in the first half of the 20th century, some people supported homework reform, such as by making the assignments more relevant to the students' non-school lives, rather than prohibiting it.

In the 1950s, with increasing pressure on the United States to stay ahead in the Cold War, homework made a resurgence, and children were encouraged to keep up with their Russian counterparts. From that time on, social attitudes have oscillated approximately on a 15-year cycle: homework was encouraged in the 1950s to mid-1960s; it was rejected from the mid-1960s until 1980; it was encouraged again from 1980 and the publication of A Nation at Risk until the mid-1990s, when the Cold War ended.  At that time, American schools were overwhelmingly in favor of issuing some homework to students of all grade levels. Homework was less favored after the end of the Cold War.

United Kingdom 
British students get more homework than many other countries in Europe. The weekly average for the subject is 5 hours. The main distinction for UK homework is the social gap, with middle-class teenagers getting a disproportionate amount of homework compared to Asia and Europe.

Spain 
In 2012, a report by the OECD showed that Spanish children spend 6.4 hours a week on homework. This prompted the CEAPA, representing 12,000 Spanish parent associations, to call for a homework strike.

Criticism 

Homework and its effects, justifications, motivations and alleged benefits have been the subject of sharp criticism among many education experts and researchers.

According to a study by the Dresden University of Technology, homework—described in the study as "an educational ritual"—has little to no influence on academic performance. 

When assigning homework, each student is usually given the same exercises, regardless of how well the student is performing. This leaves some students under-challenged and others overwhelmed by their homework. For others, the degree of difficulty of homework may be appropriate, but students are unable to decide for themselves whether they need to deepen their knowledge in a particular subject or whether to use the time in other subjects with which they experience more difficulty, despite the fact that homework is often seen as a way of encouraging self-regulation.

Homework is sometimes used to outsource school material not completed in class to the home, leaving children with homework that is not designed to be done on their own and parents feeling helpless and frustrated. As a consequence, students often have to use the internet or other resources for help, which provides disadvantages for students without internet access. Thus, such homework fails to promote equality of opportunity. Homework without professional feedback from the teacher has little effect on the learning success of students.

Even if it is generally not wanted by homework distributors (unless homework is given as a punishment), completing homework may take up a large part of the student's free time. It is often the case that children try to finish their homework until late at night, which can lead to sleep disorders and unhealthy stress. Children may feel overwhelmed when they have too much homework, which can negatively affect children's natural curiosity and thirst for knowledge.

A study by the UCL Institute of Education, which concerned the impact of homework in different countries, discovered that the pressure associated with homework causes arguments among family members. The study also showed that homework can lead to anxiety, depression, and emotional exhaustion among children.

Notes and references

Citations

Works

Effectiveness of homework

Homework and non-academic effects

Other 

 
 
  Chapter 2  is free to read.

Further reading 
 Duke Study: Homework Helps Students Succeed in School, As Long as There Isn't Too Much
 The Case Against Homework: How Homework Is Hurting Our Children and What We Can Do About It by Sarah Bennett & Nancy Kalish (2006) Discusses in detail assessments of studies on homework and the authors' own research and assessment of the homework situation in the United States. Has specific recommendations and sample letters to be used in negotiating a reduced homework load for your child.
 Closing the Book on Homework: Enhancing Public Education and Freeing Family Time by John Buell (2004)
 The Battle Over Homework: Common Ground for Administrators, Teachers, and Parents by Harris Cooper (2007)
 The Homework Myth: Why Our Kids Get Too Much of a Bad Thing by Alfie Kohn (2006)
 The End of Homework: How Homework Disrupts families, Overburdens Children, and Limits Learning by Etta Kralovec and John Buell (2000)

External links 

 "The Myth About Homework", Claudia Wallis, Time, August 29, 2006.
 History of "The Dog Ate My Homework" as an excuse. Slate.
 Bridging the Great Homework Divide: A Solutions Guide for Parents of Middle School Students - from the National Education Association.
 Homework tips for parents - U.S. Department of Education.
 BBC's (U.K.) parents' school guide
 Helping Your Students With Homework: A Guide For Teachers - U.S. Department of Education.
 Homework Practices that Support Students with Disabilities

Education reform
Learning methods
School terminology
Standards-based education
Home